Muhammad ibn Sa'id al-Tamimi, (died 990), known by his kunya, "Abu Abdullah," but more commonly as Al-Tamimi, the physician, was a tenth-century physician, who came to renown on account of his medical works. Born in Jerusalem, Al-Tamimi spent his early years in and around Jerusalem where he studied medicine under the tutelage of two local physicians, Al-Hasan ibn Abi Nu'aym, and a Christian monk, Anba Zecharia ben Thawabah. Al-Tamimi possessed an uncommon knowledge of plants and their properties, such that his service in this field was highly coveted and brought him to serve as the personal physician of the Ikhshidid Governor of Ramla, al-Hassan bin Abdullah bin Tughj al-Mastouli, before being asked to render his services in Old Cairo, Egypt. Around 970, Al-Tamimi had settled in Old Cairo, Egypt, and there prospered in his medical field, writing a medical work for the vizier, Ya'qub ibn Killis (930–991), a Baghdadi Jew who came to work in Egypt under the auspices of the Fatimids. He specialized in compounding simple drugs and medicines, but is especially known for his having concocted a theriac reputed as a proven antidote in snakebite and other poisons, which he named tiryaq al-fārūq (the antidote of salvation) because of its exceptional qualities.

Biography
Little is known of al-Tamimi's personal life. Among al-Tamimi's contemporaries was the famed Arab geographer, Al-Muqaddasi, also from Jerusalem. Like Al-Muqaddasi, he brings down in his writings curious anecdotes about the geography of Palestine and the agronomic practices of its inhabitants, as well as its mineral resources.

Medical works
Al-Tamimi's most-prized medical work is The Guidebook to Basics in Food Nutrition and the Properties of non-compounded Medicines, known also under its abbreviated name, Al-Murshid, of which only portions have survived. This work which treats on the properties of certain plants (antidotes) and minerals has laid the foundation for subsequent works written on medicine by other authors, particularly that composed by Ibn al-Baytar in Cairo (d. 1248/646 H), in which he treats on various antidotes used to remedy poisons inflicted by snakebite and scorpion stings, and an important Arabic treatise on antidotes for poisons written by `Ali ibn `Abd al-`Aẓim al-Anṣāri in Syria in 1270 (669 H), entitled Dhikr al-tiryaq al-faruq (Memoir on Antidotes for Poisons), where he quotes from al-Tamimi's works, some of which are no longer extant. Maimonides (1138–1204), the Jewish rabbi and physician, also made use of his works, and is quoted as saying of him: "This man who was in Jerusalem, and whose name was al-Tamimi, composed a book, calling it 'al-Murshid,' that is to say, 'Guide' ['that which leads aright']. They say that he was [a man] of a great learning experience. Now although most of his words were accounts drawn from others, and occasionally he would err by bringing down the words of others, nevertheless he has generally mentioned many peculiar remedies in the nature of foods, what are seen as affecting many cures [for ailments]. I have therefore deemed it fitting to speak of them, what seemed to me of them to be right in foods and in medicines."

Although only portions of al-Tamimi's seminal work have survived, a section of the book (chapters 12, 13 and 14) which treats on rocks and minerals, including asphalt, is today held at the Bibliothèque nationale de France in Paris, in manuscript form (Paris MS. no. 2870), consisting of 172 pages. Other sections of al-Tamimi's original work were copied by `Ali ibn `Abd al-`Aẓim al-Anṣāri in 1270, now preserved at the U.S. National Library of Medicine in Bethesda, Maryland. Spanish-born pharmacologist, Ibn al-Baytar, cites al-Tamimi some seventy times. Abstracts of these manuscripts have been published in Hebrew by Yaron Serri and Zohar Amar of Bar-Ilan University, in the book, "The Land of Israel and Syria as Described by al-Tamimi."

Al-Tamimi's works on materia medica are an invaluable source for understanding the curative remedies that were in use in Syria and Palestine during the early Muslim period (until 1099). They often relate to the daily life and beliefs of the local residents, as well as the practical usages of plants, particularly in the region of greater Jerusalem and the Dead Sea basin. He also sheds light on the process of Islamization of Jerusalem and its environs during that period. Al-Tamimi's theriac recension is of particular importance to botanists, as he describes in great detail the recognizable features of the plants used as electuaries, as also the proper season for gathering such plants. His other important medical works include:

 Māddat-ul-Baqā' fi Iṣlāḥ Fasad il-Ḥawā w-al-taḥarruz min Ḍarar-il-Awbā`  (The Extension of Life by Purifying the Air of Corruption and Guarding against the Evil Effects of Pestilences), a book written for his friend, the Fatimid vizier, Ya'qub ibn Killis.
 Maqālah fī Māhīyat-ul-Ramad wa Anwā'uhū wa Asbābuhū wa 'Ilājuh (Treatise on the Nature of Ophthalmology and its Types, Causes and Treatment)
 Ḥabīb al-'arūs, wa-rayḥān al-nufūs (The Beloved of the Bride, and the [Fragrant] Basil of Souls)
 Miftāḥ al-Surrūr fī kul al-Hummūm (The Key to Pleasure in all Worries)
 Several works on how to compound Theriac

References

Bibliography

 
 --

 

 
 Greenberg, S.J. (1996). A Shelflist of Islamic Medical Manuscripts at the National Library of Medicine, Maryland

Further reading
 Lucien Leclerc, Histoire de la médicine arabe, vol. 1, Paris 1876, pp. 388–391 (Al-Tamimi) (French)
 Fuat Sezgin, Geschichte des arabischen Schrifttums, vol. iii: Medizin, Pharmazie, Zoologie, Tierheilkunde, Leiden: E.J. Brill 1970, pp. 317–318 (German)

External links
 Pharmaceutics and Alchemy
 "The Land of Israel and Syria as Described by al-Tamimi" (Hebrew)

990 deaths
Physicians from the Fatimid Caliphate
Medieval Syrian physicians
Pharmacologists of the medieval Islamic world
10th-century physicians
10th-century Arabic books
Scientists from Jerusalem
10th-century Egyptian people
Scholars from the Fatimid Caliphate
Natural history of Palestine (region)